Live in Tokyo is a live album by saxophonist Charles McPherson which was recorded in Japan in 1976 and released on the Xanadu label.

Reception

The AllMusic review awarded the album 4½ stars, stating "McPherson is in top form".

Track listing 
All compositions by Charles McPherson except as indicated
 "Tokyo Blue"7:14  
 "East of the Sun" (Brooks Bowman)5:32  
 "Desafinado" (Antonio Carlos Jobim, Newton Mendonça)8:32  
 "Orient Express"9:13  
 "These Foolish Things" (Eric Maschwitz, Jack Strachey, Harry Link)6:18
 "Bouncing with Bud" (Bud Powell)6:34

Personnel 
Charles McPhersonalto saxophone
Barry Harrispiano
Sam Jonesbass, cello
Leroy Williamsdrums

References 

Charles McPherson (musician) live albums
1976 live albums
Xanadu Records live albums
Albums produced by Don Schlitten